Myrcella Baratheon is a fictional character in the A Song of Ice and Fire series of epic fantasy novels by American author George R. R. Martin, and its television adaptation Game of Thrones.  Myrcella's character, development and her interactions and impact differ greatly between the two media.

Introduced in 1996's A Game of Thrones, Myrcella is the only daughter of Cersei Lannister from the kingdom of Westeros. She subsequently appeared in Martin's A Clash of Kings (1998) and A Feast for Crows (2005).

Myrcella is portrayed by Irish actress Aimee Richardson in the first two seasons of the HBO television adaptation, while English actress Nell Tiger Free portrays her in the show's fifth and sixth seasons.

Character
Since Myrcella Baratheon is not a point of view character in A Song of Ice and Fire, the reader learns about her through other characters' perspectives, such as her uncle Tyrion Lannister. She is a background character in the books.

Storylines

A Game of Thrones
Myrcella is introduced in A Game of Thrones (1996) as the only daughter of Queen Cersei Lannister and King Robert Baratheon. In her first appearance, she accompanies her parents, her two brothers (Joffrey and Tommen Baratheon), and her two "uncles" (Tyrion and Jaime Lannister) to Winterfell where Robert asks Eddard Stark to be appointed as Hand of the King. She is later shown attending the tournament to celebrate Eddard's inauguration into his position. While investigating Jon Arryn's death, Eddard discovers that Myrcella and her brothers are the products of an incestuous affair between Cersei and Jaime.

A Clash of Kings
In 1998's A Clash of Kings, Myrcella attends Joffrey's nameday as King. She greets her uncle Tyrion and tells him that she is glad that the rumors of his death were false. During the War of the Five Kings, Tyrion makes plans to forge an alliance with House Martell of Dorne by having Myrcella wed to Trystane Martell, the son of the current ruler of Dorne, but part of the arrangement involved sending her to Dorne to live in the Martell household.

A Feast for Crows
During A Storm of Swords (2000), Trystane's sister Arianne Martell plans to crown Myrcella as Robert's heir instead of Tommen, hoping to incite the Dornishmen to rebel against the Lannisters to seat her on the Iron Throne. However, Doran Martell has been tipped off to the conspiracy and his men ambush Arianne's party as they attempt to sail up the Greenblood. In the ensuing confrontation, one of Arianne's co-conspirators, Ser Gerold "Darkstar" Dayne, attempts to kill Myrcella; although unsuccessful, he cuts off one of her ears and leaves her scarred.

A Dance with Dragons
In A Dance with Dragons (2011), Myrcella travels back to King's Landing with Nymeria Sand.

TV adaptation

Overview 
In the HBO television adaptation, Aimee Richardson portrayed Myrcella for the first two seasons. Initially cast as a stand-in, Richardson impressed the crew enough to be kept as a full cast member; she appeared in eight episodes. Nell Tiger Free played Myrcella for the seasons five and six. Prior to her audition, Free had never seen the show; when talking about the role, she said: "I mean, it’s every kids dream to play a princess and the dresses were fantastic." Richardson learned about the recasting at the San Diego Comic-Con; in response, she posted a Vine video in which she wore a crown and held a sign saying "Princess for Hire". An explanation was not given for the change in actors.

Myrcella's fate was one of several differences between how the television show and the novels represented the Sand Snakes and Dorne. Her death scene was originally longer with parallels to Joffrey's death; it would have involved her head exploding and gore splattered throughout the set. Discussing these changes, Free said: "[David Benioff and D. B. Weiss] wanted Myrcella’s death to reflect her life, and wanted it to be sweet – which is rare for [Game of] Thrones." Esquire's Matt Miller wrote that the final version was tamer in comparison to other characters' deaths. Free appeared in six episodes of the show.

Storylines

Season 1 and 2 
Myrcella's storyline in the first two seasons follows the books.  Myrcella makes her debut, looking "like a Disney Princess" as she arrives with the Lannisters at Winterfell in the series premiere. She is later seen along with her brother Tommen at Joffrey's nameday. Tyrion later sends her off to Dorne to marry into House Martell, so that House Lannister can gain an alliance with them.

Season 5 and 6
Myrcella (now much older) is seen walking through the Water Gardens with Trystane, with whom she has fallen in love, while being watched by Ellaria Sand and Prince Doran Martell. Ellaria, furious about Oberyn's death, offers to torture Myrcella and send pieces of her back to take revenge on Cersei, whom she feels is responsible for orchestrating Tyrion's show trial which led to the trial by combat that took Oberyn's life, but Doran refuses to harm her. Myrcella is surprised when her "uncle" Jaime Lannister and Bronn finally meet her as she is with Trystane in the gardens. She is upset after Bronn is forced to knock Trystane unconscious, and resists Jaime's urging to leave with him. The Sand Snakes make a sudden ambush in order to kidnap her. She is nearly taken hostage by Nymeria, but the conflict is interrupted after Areo Hotah arrives with a dozen Dornish guards, imprisoning Jaime, Bronn, the Sand Snakes and Ellaria. Myrcella visits Jaime while he is in custody. Jaime tells her that about the situation with Ellaria. He tells her that he needs to take her home to King's Landing. Myrcella, failing to understand, assures him that Dorne is her home now, and that she will stay and marry Trystane. However, her marriage to Trystane never happens as she is poisoned by Ellaria and the Sand Snakes just before she leaves Dorne with Jamie and Bronn. As she is sailing away towards King's Landing, she dies in Jaime's arms moments after acknowledging him as her father.

In Season 6, Episode 2, her body returns home to King's Landing shortly after her death, and her corpse, complete with stones over her eyes, is later seen in the Great Sept of Baelor. Myrcella is later avenged by Euron Greyjoy, who kills Obara and Nymeria in combat, and delivers Ellaria and Tyene to Cersei to exact her revenge.

Family tree of House Lannister

References

Notes

Citations

A Song of Ice and Fire characters
Female characters in literature
Fictional characters with disfigurements
Literary characters introduced in 1996
Female characters in television
Fictional murdered people
Fictional offspring of incestuous relationships
Fictional princesses
Child characters in literature
Teenage characters in television
Television characters introduced in 2011